St Thomas Church (Sankt Thomas Kirke) is a church building of the Church of Denmark in the Frederiksberg district of Copenhagen, Denmark. It was designed by architect Carl Lendorf (1839-1918) and built in 1898.

References

External links
Sankt Thomas Kirke website

Lutheran churches in Copenhagen